The Peavey Mart Centrium (formerly ENMAX Centrium) is a two-tier 7,111-seat multi-purpose arena in Red Deer, Alberta, Canada. The arena is a multi-use facility accommodating national events, concerts, hockey, rodeo, trade shows, and even graduations.  It was built in 1991 and is the home arena of the Red Deer Rebels hockey team. The arena can hold a maximum of 7,819 people when floor seating is used,making it the third largest WHL arena not shared with an NHL team. "Half house" seating is 3,357 when floor to ceiling divider curtains are used to mask off unused seating.

Located in Westerner Park in the south end of Red Deer, the Peavey Mart Centrium is the largest indoor venue in Red Deer and Central Alberta. Besides hockey, it also hosts concerts, basketball, motor sports, ice shows, major curling events, circuses, boxing, rodeos, professional wrestling, trade shows and conventions.

Various notable artists have performed here, including Snoop Dogg, Mötley Crüe, Nickelback, Hilary Duff, Elton John, Bryan Adams, Billy Talent, Skillet, Rush, Trooper, and Hedley.

It was the primary site for the 1995 World Junior Ice Hockey Championships, the 2004 and 2012 Scotties Tournament of Hearts and Game 7 of the 2007 Super Series.

In 2012, the Centrium expansion was completed. The expansion added 13 more luxury suites, a new 40-seat club suite and an additional 1,000 seats.

The Centrium hosted the 2016 Memorial Cup. It was to host the 2021 World Junior Ice Hockey Championships with Rogers Place in Edmonton, but the event was held behind closed doors in a bio-secure bubble in Edmonton due to COVID-19. The tournament scheduled for the Centrium again in 2022, but was curtailed due to COVID-19. A replay was scheduled for August 2022, but it was decided that the tournament would once again be held exclusively in Edmonton. 

After the expiration of a previous sponsorship with ENMAX, Red Deer-based Peavey Mart acquired the naming rights to the Centrium in July 2021 under a five-year deal.

Dimensions
Ice surface: , 
Arena level, seating removed: 
Concourse Level: 
Height:  to roof truss

References

External links
 Official site

Buildings and structures in Red Deer, Alberta
Indoor arenas in Alberta
Indoor ice hockey venues in Canada
Sport in Red Deer, Alberta
Western Hockey League arenas